Leucosyrinx climoi is an extinct species of sea snail, a marine gastropod mollusk in the family Pseudomelatomidae, the turrids and allies.

Distribution
Fossils of this marine species were found in New Zealand.

References

 Maxwell, Phillip A. Late Miocene deep-water Mollusca from the Stillwater Mudstone at Greymouth, westland, New Zealand: paleoecology and systematics. No. 55. New Zealand Geological Survey, 1988.
 Maxwell, P.A. (2009). Cenozoic Mollusca. pp 232–254 in Gordon, D.P. (ed.) New Zealand inventory of biodiversity. Volume one. Kingdom Animalia: Radiata, Lophotrochozoa, Deuterostomia. Canterbury University Press, Christchurch.

climoi
Gastropods described in 1988
Gastropods of New Zealand